is a former Japanese football player.

Club statistics

References

External links

J. League (#24)

1987 births
Living people
Kokushikan University alumni
Association football people from Kanagawa Prefecture
Japanese footballers
J2 League players
Japan Football League players
Vanraure Hachinohe players
FC Machida Zelvia players
FC Ryukyu players
Kagoshima United FC players
Association football defenders